The Framnes Mountains are an Antarctic mountain range consisting of Casey Range, Masson Range, David Range, and Brown Range, and adjacent peaks and mountains. The three major ranges and other lesser features were sighted and named in February 1931 by the British Australian New Zealand Antarctic Research Expedition under Douglas Mawson. This coast was also sighted by Norwegian whalers in the same season. The whole area was mapped in detail by Norwegian cartographers from aerial photographs taken by the Lars Christensen Expedition in January 1937. This overall name for the several ranges was given by Lars Christensen after Framnesfjellet, a hill near Sandefjord, Norway.

Features of the Framnes Mountains 

 Brown Range
 Butler Nunataks
 Casey Range
 David Range
 Masson Range
 Shark Peak
 Trilling Peaks
 Van Hulssen Nunatak

Further reading 
 Damien Gildea, Mountaineering in Antarctica: complete guide: Travel guide
 James P. Minard, United States. Antarctic Projects Office, Glaciology and Glacial Geology of Antarctica, P 19
 J.L.C. CHAMBERS, J.L. WILSON, D.A. ADAMSON A CRYSTALLOGRAPHIC STUDY OF THE PERENNIALLY FROZEN ICE SURFACE OF PATTERNED LAKE, FRAMNES MOUNTAINS, EAST ANTARCTICA , Journal of Glaciology, Vol. 32, No. 112, 1986

External links 

 Framnes Mountains on USGS website
 Framnes Mountains on AADC website
 Framnes Mountains on SCAR website

References

Mountain ranges of Mac. Robertson Land